Jeremy Seewer (18 July 1994) is a Swiss professional motocross racer who was second the overall ranking of MXGP World Championship in 2019 and 2020.

References

External links
 Jeremy Seewer at MXGP

Living people
1994 births
Swiss motorcycle racers
Motocross riders